Rodrigo Pacheco Méndez (born 25 April 2005) is a Mexican tennis player. He has reached a career high ATP singles ranking of No. 1310 achieved on 15 August 2022 and a career high doubles ranking of No. 1062 on 8 August 2022.

Career
Pacheco Méndez turned professional in 2022. He currently plays mainly on the junior circuit. He has a career high junior ranking of No. 3 achieved on 16 January 2023. He reached the quarterfinals of the Junior Australian Open and the Junior French Open in 2022.

Pacheco Méndez made his ATP debut at the 2022 Los Cabos Open in the main singles draw.

He received a wildcard for the main draw of the 2023 Abierto Mexicano Telcel.

References

External links

2005 births
Living people
Mexican male tennis players
21st-century Mexican people